Rimminen is a Finnish surname. Notable people with the surname include:

 Marjut Rimminen (born 1944), Finnish-born animator and film director 
 Mikko Rimminen (born 1975), Finnish novelist and poet

Finnish-language surnames